Leaf sucker can mean:
 a leaf blower in suction mode
 a street sweeper machine with suction ability, as translation of German Laubsauger
 an insect that sucks sap from leaves, see aphid or hemiptera

See also
 Leaf (disambiguation)
 Sucker (disambiguation)